Cavour Morris (born 3 August 1932) is a Barbadian former sports shooter. He competed in the 50 metre rifle, prone event at the 1972 Summer Olympics.

References

1932 births
Living people
Barbadian male sport shooters
Olympic shooters of Barbados
Shooters at the 1972 Summer Olympics
Place of birth missing (living people)